Shredded Corpse was a grindcore, death metal band that formed 1991 from Little Rock, Arkansas. They released several demos through the 1990s, Death Brings Erection and Vomit, and several others. The band released their first commercial release, Exhumed and Molested, in 1996 for Wild Rags Records. Their second full-length album, Human Obliteration, was released in 1998 through Frozen Dawn Records. Another album entitled 'Total Hate Existence' was scheduled but was never released.

Frontman Rocky Gray and drummer David Sroczynski went on to form the metal band Soul Embraced. Gray later joined Living Sacrifice from 1998 to 2003 and in 2002 joined Evanescence.  David now plays drums in Napalm Christ.

Line-up
Steve Scrott (little mosh) - guitar, vocals
Rocky Gray - vocals, guitar, keyboards, bass 
David Sroczynski - drums

Past members
Kiffin Rogers - bass
Kirk - guitar
Bryan - guitar
Matt -  guitar
Bobby Redd - guitar
Joseph Bates - vocals
Columbus - vocals

Discography
Eternally Sick - demo
Dead - demo
Vomit - demo
Ejaculate on the Soul - demo
Death Brings Erection - demo
Exhumed and Molested - full-length, Wild Rags Records
Human Obliteration - full-length, Frozen Dawn Records

References

Musical groups established in 1991
Musical groups disestablished in 1998
Heavy metal musical groups from Arkansas
1991 establishments in Arkansas
Musical groups from Little Rock, Arkansas
American death metal musical groups